Erina Ice Arena was built in 2004 on the Central Coast of New South Wales boasting a state of the art olympic-sized ice sports facility measuring 60m x 30m with the capacity for figure, speed, synchronized, curling and ice hockey. The arena also functions as a social venue for spectators, boasting a grandstand capacity of 500 suitable for large events. 

Closed for building works in August of 2019, the rink was revitalised by new owners and reopened in January 2021.

Erina Ice Arena aims to create a safe space for the community to enjoy recreational skating with their friends and family and to provide a variety of programs to encourage the development of grass roots ice sports.

See also

List of ice rinks in Australia

References

External links
 

Sport on the Central Coast (New South Wales)
1987 establishments in Australia
Sports venues completed in 1987
Indoor arenas in Australia
Figure skating venues in Australia
Ice hockey venues in Australia
Speed skating venues in Australia